The 50,000 yen coin is a denomination of the Japanese yen. Only one coin was ever issued for this denomination which commemorated the wedding of Crown Prince Naruhito to Masako. These coins did not circulate, and were made in uncirculated and proof coinage format for collectors by the Japan Mint.

Commemorative

References

External links
Commemorative coins issued - Japan Mint website (In English)

Japanese yen coins
Commemorative coins of Japan